PFK Piešťany is a Slovak football team, based in the town of Piešťany. The club was founded in 1912.

References

External links 

  ]

Football clubs in Slovakia
Association football clubs established in 1912
1912 establishments in Slovakia